Dolma is a family of stuffed vegetable dishes.

Dolma may also refer to:

People
 Alan Dawa Dolma (born 1987), Chinese pop singer of Tibetan ethnicity, active in China and Japan
 Ani Choying Dolma (born 1971), Nepalese Buddhist nun
 Dicky Dolma (born 1974), Indian mountaineer
 Dolma Gyari (born 1964), Tibetan politician in exile
 Dolma Kyab (born 1976), Tibetan writer and teacher
 Dolma Yangchen, president of the Tibetan Women's Association
 Jamyang Dolma (born 1984), Chinese pop singer of Tibetan ethnicity
 Lhaki Dolma, Bhutanese actress and politician
 Lobsang Dolma Khangkar (1934–1989), practitioner of traditional Tibetan medicine
 Shelok Dolma (born 1987), Chinese wrestler of Tibetan ethnicity
 Sonam Dolma Brauen (born 1953), Tibetan-Swiss painter
 Tsering Dolma (1919–1964), older sister of the 14th Dalai Lama
 Tseten Dolma (born 1937), Chinese soprano of Tibetan ethnicity

Other uses
 Dolma (film), a 2012 Tibetan film

See also